När verkligheten tränger sig på is the debut studio album by Swedish singer-songwriter Patrik Isaksson. All of the tracks on the album were written by Isaksson and produced by Anders Glenmark. The album peaked at number one on the Swedish Albums Chart and was certified platinum in week 47 in 1999.

Track listing
Hos dig är jag underbar
Nell
Du får göra som du vill
Kom genom eld
Vågorna
Lycklig man
Lyckligare dagar
Kan du se mig
Längesen
Älskat för två
Inget kan gå fel

Personnel 
Adapted from Tidal.

Patrik Isaksson - composer, vocals, guitar
Anders Glenmark - producing, bass, piano
Henka Johansson - drums

Charts

References

External links

1999 debut albums
Patrik Isaksson (singer) albums
Swedish-language albums